Vicco Laboratories (founded as Vishnu Industrial Chemical Company) is a manufacturer of Indian Ayurvedic herbal hygiene, healthcare and other products like herbal tooth pastes, herbal tooth powders, natural turmeric and sandalwood oil based skin cream, herbal shaving creams and a natural ayurvedic pain relief cream Vicco Narayani.

History
It was founded by Keshav Vishnu Pendharkar in 1952.

References 

Pharmaceutical companies of India
Companies based in Mumbai
Chemical companies established in 1952
Indian brands
Ayurvedic companies
1952 establishments in Bombay State